Arigato Service Dream Stadium is a football ground in Imabari, Ehime, Japan. It is the home ground of FC Imabari until 2022.

History 
From 2023, FC Imabari move to new stadium in Satoyama Stadium officially opening on 29 January 2023.

Gallery

References

FC Imabari
Football venues in Japan
Sports venues in Ehime Prefecture
Imabari, Ehime
Sports venues completed in 2017
2017 establishments in Japan